Zinc D-Ala-D-Ala carboxypeptidase (Zn2+ G peptidase, D-alanyl-D-alanine hydrolase, D-alanyl-D-alanine-cleaving carboxypeptidase, DD-carboxypeptidase, G enzyme, DD-carboxypeptidase-transpeptidase) is an enzyme. This enzyme catalyses the following chemical reaction

 Cleavage of the bond: (Ac)2-L-lysyl-D-alanyl--D-alanine

This is a zinc enzyme. Catalyses carboxypeptidation but not transpeptidation reactions involved in bacterial cell wall metabolism.

References

External links 
 

EC 3.4.17